{{Infobox album
| name       = Christmas '64
| type       = studio
| artist     = Jimmy Smith
| cover      = Jimmy Smith Christmas 64.jpeg
| alt        =
| released   = 1964
| recorded   = April 20 & September 29, 1964
| venue      =
| studio     = Van Gelder Studio, Englewwod Cliffs, NJ
| genre      = Jazz, Christmas
| length     = 48:51
| label      = Verve
| producer   = Creed Taylor
| prev_title = Who's Afraid of Virginia Woolf?
| prev_year  = 1964
| next_title = Monster
| next_year  = 1965
| misc       = {{Extra album cover
 | header  = Alternative cover / title
 | type    = album
 | cover   = christmasjimmy.jpg
 | border  =
 | alt     =
 | caption = 1966 LP re-issue as Christmas Cookin}}
}}Christmas '64 is a 1964  studio album by the American jazz organist Jimmy Smith. Smith's only album of Christmas music, it was reissued as Christmas Cookin''' in 1966.

Reception

A review on AllMusic said that "Compared to most Christmas albums, this is plenty groovy, with lots of Smith's trademark dexterity and bop runs on offer." An AllMusic review of the reissued Christmas Cookin''', by Scott Yanow said that "...even if nothing all that unusual occurs, the performances can serve as high-quality background music during the Christmas season".

 Track listing 
 "God Rest Ye Merry Gentlemen" (Traditional) – 4:19
 "Jingle Bells" (James Pierpont) – 3:15
 "We Three Kings of Orient Are" (John Henry Hopkins Jr.) – 3:45
 "The Christmas Song" (Mel Tormé, Bob Wells) – 4:32
 "White Christmas" (Irving Berlin) – 2:51
 "Santa Claus Is Coming to Town" (J. Fred Coots, Haven Gillespie) – 5:26
 "Silent Night" (Franz Gruber, Josef Mohr) – 4:04
 "God Rest Ye Merry Gentlemen" – 6:11

Bonus tracks on Christmas Cookin 1992 CD reissue
 "Baby, It's Cold Outside" (Frank Loesser) – 6:00
from Jimmy & Wes: The Dynamic Duo
 "Greensleeves" (Traditional) – 8:53
from Organ Grinder Swing

Personnel

Musicians
 Jimmy Smith – organ, (all tracks), arranger, (tracks 2, 6, 8)
 Kenny Burrell – guitar, (tracks 1, 3-5, 7)
 Quentin Warren – guitar, (tracks 2, 6, 8)
 Art Davis – double bass, (tracks 1, 3-5, 7)
 Grady Tate – drums, (tracks 1, 3-5, 7)
 Billy Hart – drums, (tracks 2, 6, 8)
 Margaret Ross – harp, (tracks 1, 3-5, 7)
 Joe Newman – flugelhorn, (tracks 1, 3-5, 7)
 Paul Faulise, Tommy Mitchell – bass trombone, (tracks 1, 3-5, 7)
 Chauncey Welsch, Jimmy Cleveland – trombone, (tracks 1, 3-5, 7)
 Ernie Royal, Danny Stiles, Joe Wilder, Bernie Glow – trumpet, (tracks 1, 3-5, 7)
 Jim Buffington, Earl Chapin, Donald Corrado, Morris Secon – french horn, (tracks 1, 3-5, 7)
 Harvey Phillips – tuba, (tracks 1, 3-5, 7)
 George Devens – percussion, (tracks 1, 3-5, 7)
 Billy Byers - arranger, conductor, (tracks 1, 4--5, 7)
 Al Cohn - arranger, (track 3)

Technical
 Creed Taylor – producer
 Rudy Van Gelder – engineer
 Val Valentin – director of engineering
 Bob Irwin – mastering
 Hollis King – art direction
 Sherniece Smith – art producer
 Acy Lehman – cover design
 Howell Conent – photography

References 

1964 Christmas albums
Albums produced by Creed Taylor
Albums recorded at Van Gelder Studio
Christmas albums by American artists
Jimmy Smith (musician) albums
Verve Records albums
Jazz Christmas albums